Robert "Buck" Friedman (September 11, 1921 – December 9, 1989) was an American football tackle. 

Friedman was born in Allentown, Pennsylvania, in 1921. He attended Allentown High School and the University of Washington. He played college football for Washington from 1940 to 1942.

He played professional football in the National Football League (NFL) for the Philadelphia Eagles in 1944, appearing in ten games, eight of them as starter. In 1946, he also played for the Bethlehem Bulldogs of the American Association. 

Friedman died in 1989 at age 68.

References

1921 births
1989 deaths
Philadelphia Eagles players
American football tackles
Players of American football from Pennsylvania
Sportspeople from Allentown, Pennsylvania